This article shows a list of town tramway systems in Belarus. It includes all known tram systems in Belarus, past and present; cities with currently operating systems, and those systems themselves, are indicated in bold and blue background colored rows. Those tram systems that operated on other than standard gauge track (where known) are indicated in the 'Notes' column.

Overview
The first electric tramway systems in Belarus started on 13 October 1929 when two Belarusian tramlines were created in Minsk. There are now 11 tramlines in Minsk.

List of systems

Maps of the systems

See also
Rail transport in Belarus
Transport in Belarus
List of town tramway systems in Europe

External links

 
Tramways
Belarus